The 2021 USC Trojans baseball team represents the University of Southern California during the 2021 NCAA Division I baseball season. The Trojans play their home games for the 47th season at Dedeaux Field. The team is coached by Jason Gill in his 2nd season at USC.

Previous season
The Trojans began the 2020 season 10-5, good for a tie for third-place in the Pac-12 prior to the NCAA's decision to cancel the season on March 12 due to the COVID-19 pandemic. Due to the season's cancellation, all Division I college baseball players were granted an extra year of eligibility.

Personnel

Roster

Coaches

Schedule and results

Rankings

2021 MLB draft

References 

USC
USC Trojans baseball seasons
USC Baseball